The 2007 Suwon Samsung Bluewings season was the Suwon Samsung Bluewings' twelfth season in the South Korean K-League. The club competed in the K-League, League Cup and Korean FA Cup.

Squad

Backroom Staff

Coaching Staff
Head coach:  Cha Bum-Kun
Assistant coach:  Lee Lim-Saeng 
Coach:  Park Kun-Ha
Reserve Team Coach:  Choi Man-Hee
GK Coach:  Cho Byung-Deuk
Physical trainer:  Richard Fratz

Scouter
 Kim Soon-Ki
 Jung Kyu-Poong

Executive Office
Club Chairman:  Lee Yoon-Woo 
Managing Director:  Ahn Ki-Hyun

Honours

Club

Individual
K-League Rookie of the Year:  Ha Tae-Goon
K-League Best XI:  Mato,  Lee Kwan-Woo

References

See also
 Suwon Bluewings Official website

Suwon Samsung Bluewings seasons
Suwon Samsung Bluewings